Communication is the act of creating and conveying information.

Communication(s) may also refer to:

Topics
 Communication studies, the study of human communication
 Organizational communication, a branch of the above
 Communication theory, concepts about communication
 Computer-mediated communication, CMC
 Information and communication technologies, ICT
 Inter-process communication, IPC
 Glossary of contract bridge terms for the use in the game of bridge

Types
 Animal communication, a socially affective behavior between non-humans
 Cat communication, between cats
 Input/output, between computers
 Creative writing, a method of communication 
 Environmental communication
 Human communication
 Interpersonal communication, between individual people
 Military communication, military communicative activity
 Line of communication LOC (or communications), the route that connects a military unit (in action) with its supply base
 Technical communication, conveying technical information
 Telecommunication, the transmission of signals over a distance for the purpose of communication
 Writing, a method of communication

Music

Albums
 Communication (Bobby Womack album) or the title song, 1971
 Communication (Bugskull album) or the title song, 2009
 Communication (Jazz Composer's Orchestra album), 1965
 The Jazz Composer's Orchestra (album), sometimes referred to as Communications, 1968
 Communication (Karl Bartos album), 2003
 Communication (Nelson Riddle album), 1971
 Communication!!!, by Leah Dizon, or the title song, 2008
 Communication, an EP by Nicole Millar, 2016

Songs
 "Communication" (Hitomi Takahashi song), 2006
 "Communication" (John Farnham song), 1989
 "Communication" (Power Station song),  1985
 "Communication" (Spandau Ballet song),  1983
 "Communication" (Armin van Buuren song), 1999
 "Communication", by the Cardigans from Long Gone Before Daylight, 2003
 "Communication", by Janet Jackson from Dream Street, 1984
 "Communication", by Mario Più, 1999
 "Communication", by Pete Townshend from All the Best Cowboys Have Chinese Eyes, 1982

Other uses
 G.Communication, a Japanese company
 Communications of the ACM, monthly journal of the Association for Computing Machinery

See also
 Communicate (disambiguation)
 Communication art (disambiguation)
 Communiqué, a brief report or statement